Jarunee Sannok (born 5 January 1981) is a Thai beach volleyball player. She competed at the 2012 Asian Beach Games in Haiyang, China.

References

External links
 
 

1981 births
Living people
Jarunee Sannok
Jarunee Sannok
Asian Games medalists in beach volleyball
Jarunee Sannok
Medalists at the 2010 Asian Games
Beach volleyball players at the 2002 Asian Games
Beach volleyball players at the 2006 Asian Games
Beach volleyball players at the 2010 Asian Games
Jarunee Sannok
Jarunee Sannok
Jarunee Sannok
Southeast Asian Games medalists in volleyball
Competitors at the 2005 Southeast Asian Games
Competitors at the 2007 Southeast Asian Games
Competitors at the 2009 Southeast Asian Games
Competitors at the 2011 Southeast Asian Games
Jarunee Sannok